is a metro station on the Osaka Metro Midosuji Line located in Yodogawa-ku, Osaka, Japan.

Layout
There is an island platform serving two tracks elevated.

Osaka Metro stations
Railway stations in Japan opened in 1970